Seif Teiri (born 1 January 1994) is a Sudanese footballer that currently plays for Pharco FC of the Egyptian Premier League, and the Sudan national team.

Club career
In 2019 Teiri joined Al-Merrikh of the Sudan Premier League. In September 2021 it was announced that he had signed a three-year contract with Pharco FC of the Egyptian Premier League.

International career
Teiri made his senior international debut on 9 June 2017 in a 2019 Africa Cup of Nations qualification match against Madagascar.

International goals
Scores and results list Sudan's goal tally first.

International career statistics

References

External links

Soccerway profile

1994 births
Living people
Sudanese footballers
Association football forwards
Al-Hilal Club (Omdurman) players
Al-Merrikh SC players
Sudan Premier League players
Sudanese expatriate footballers
Sudanese expatriate sportspeople in Egypt
Expatriate footballers in Egypt